383 most commonly refers to:
 383 (number)
 AD 383, a year
 383 BC, a year

383 may also refer to:

Astronomy
 383 Janina, a Themistian asteroid
 Abell 383, a galaxy cluster
 HOPS 383, a class 0 protostar
 NGC 383, a double radio galaxy

Buildings
 383 Madison Avenue, an office building in New York City, United States
 Stalag 383, a German WW2 prisoner of war camp

Manuscripts
 Minuscule 383, a Greek manuscript of the New Testament

Transportation

Flights and routes
 American Airlines Flight 383 (1965), a Boeing 727 which crashed on approach to Cincinnati
 American Airlines Flight 383 (2016), a Boeing 767 which caught fire leaving Chicago O'Hare airport
 List of highways numbered 383

Engines
 Chrysler 383 B engine

Watercraft
 BRP Ismael Lomibao (PC-383), a Jose Andrada-class coastal patrol boat
 KRI Imam Bonjol (383), a Parchim-class corvette
 USS City of Lewes (SP-383), an American minesweeper and patrol vessel
 USS Pampanito (SS-383), a Balao-class submarine
 USS Surfbird (AM-383), an Auk-class minesweeper

Weapons
 Bersa Model 383a, an Argentinian small semi-automatic pistol